Sylvia Hanika (born 30 November 1959) is a former professional tennis player from Germany. She is best remembered for finishing runner-up at the French Open in 1981, and for winning the Year End Championships in 1982. She was ranked as high as No. 5 in the world and played left-handed.

Career
Hanika turned professional in 1977. In 1981, Hanika reached the women's singles final at the French Open, where she was defeated 6–2, 6–4 by Hana Mandlíková.

In 1982, Hanika posted the biggest win of her career when she defeated world No. 2 Martina Navratilova 1–6, 6–3, 6–4 in the final of the Avon Series Championships at Madison Square Garden in New York City. The Garden was also the site of Hanika's last big singles win: a 6–4, 6–4 defeat of No. 3 Chris Evert in the first round of the Virginia Slims Championships in 1987.

Hanika won her final top-level singles title in Athens, Greece in 1986. She retired from the tour in 1990, having won six professional singles titles and one doubles title.

Between serves she was known to bounce the ball more than anyone tennis commentator and historian Bud Collins remembers: "...as many as into the 30s.  If she faulted on the first, it was awful, another 30 or so bounces."

Major finals

Grand Slam final

Singles: 1 (0 titles, 1 runner–up)

Year-End Championships final

Singles: 1 (1 title, 0 runners-up)

WTA career finals

Singles: 24 (6–18)

Doubles: 3 (1–2)

Grand Slam singles performance timeline

Note: The Australian Open was held twice in 1977, in January and December.

See also
 Performance timelines for all female tennis players who reached at least one Grand Slam final

References

External links

1959 births
Living people
Tennis players from Munich
German female tennis players
German expatriate sportspeople in Spain
West German female tennis players
Olympic tennis players of West Germany
Tennis players at the 1988 Summer Olympics